Anura is a village in Pindra Tehsil of Varanasi district in the Indian state of Uttar Pradesh. Anura is within the Karoma gram panchayat. The village is about 18.5 kilometers North-West of Varanasi city, 321 kilometers South-East of state capital Lucknow and 797 kilometers South-East of the national capital Delhi.

Demography

Anura has a total population of 1,178 people amongst 171 families. Sex ratio of Anura is 894 and child sex ratio is 926. Uttar Pradesh state average for both ratios is 912 and 902 respectively.

Transportation

Anura can be accessed by road and does not have a railway station of its own. Nearest operational airports are Varanasi airport (16 kilometers North-West) and Allahabad Airports (135 kilometers West).

See also

Pindra Tehsil
Pindra (Assembly constituency)

References 

Villages in Varanasi district